Tāj al-Ma‘ālī Abū ‘Abd Allāh Shukr ibn Abī al-Futūḥ al-Ḥasan ibn Ja‘far al-Ḥasanī (d. 1061), also named Muhammad, was the fourth and last Musawid Emir of Mecca. He inherited the throne after the death of his father Abu al-Futuh in 400 AH (1010). During his reign he warred against the Banu Husayn of Medina and brought both holy cities under his control. He died in Ramadan 453 AH (September/October 1061), He was deposed by the Sulaymanids in 403 AH (1012) AD by Abu Tayeb Daoud bin Abdul Rahman. He had one daughter; she married Abu Hashim Muhammad ibn Ja'far. Since he had no sons one of his slaves succeeded him as Emir, but the Emirate was soon captured by sharifs of the Sulaymanid dynasty. In late 455 AH (1063) Ali al-Sulayhi captured Mecca and appointed Abu Hashim Muhammad as Emir.

References

Sharifs of Mecca
1061 deaths
11th-century Arabs